BUP may refer to:

.bup, a type of backup information file used in DVD video
bup, backup software that uses Git packfiles for storage
Bononia University Press, an Italian University Press and art book publisher
Baltic University Programme, a network of about 225 universities and other institutes of higher education in the Baltic Sea region
Bangladesh University of Professionals, a public university of Bangladesh
Banque de l'Union Parisienne, a French investment bank
Bucknell University Press, a publisher of books about the humanities and social and biological sciences